Michel Sabbah (born 19 March 1933) is a Palestinian Catholic prelate who served as the Latin Patriarch of Jerusalem from 1987 to 2008, the first non-Italian to hold the position in more than five centuries.

Biography
Sabbah was born in Nazareth, Mandatory Palestine. He began his priestly studies at the Latin Patriarchal Seminary of Beit Jala in October 1949 and was ordained a priest for the Latin Patriarchate of Jerusalem in June 1955.

Priesthood 
He was a parish priest for a few years before being sent to the University of St. Joseph in Beirut to study Arabic language and literature. Shortly thereafter, he became director of schools for the Latin Patriarchate. He served in that position until the Arab-Israeli war in 1967. Sabbah then moved to Djibouti to teach Arabic and Islamic studies until 1973, when he began doctoral studies in Arabic philology at the Sorbonne. In 1980, he was named President of the Bethlehem University. In 1987, Pope John Paul II appointed him Latin Patriarch of Jerusalem, making him the first native Palestinian to hold the office in centuries.

From 1999-2007, Sabbah was the International President of Pax Christi, a Catholic organisation promoting peace.

Sabbah resigned as Patriarch on 19 March 2008, after reaching the age of 75, the age of retirement. Sabbah is currently the Grand Prior of the chivalric Equestrian Order of the Holy Sepulchre of Jerusalem, one of the knightly orders founded in 1099.

On 11 December 2009, Sabbah together with other prominent Palestinian Christian leaders launched the Kairos Palestine Document against Israeli occupation.

See also
 Palestinian Christians
 Latin Patriarchate of Jerusalem
 Christianity in Israel

References

External links

 Biography from Latin Patriarchate of Jerusalem website
 Catholic-Hierarchy.org data on Archbishop Sabbah
 "The Middle East Peace Process: Patriarch Sabbah's View", St. Anthony Messenger, February 2002
 "Michel Sabbah – A Voice in the Wilderness" by David M. Neuhaus, SJ, "This Week in Palestine", December 2019

1933 births
Living people
University of Paris alumni
People from Nazareth
Latin Patriarchs of Jerusalem
20th-century Roman Catholic archbishops in Israel
Palestinian Roman Catholic archbishops
Saint Joseph University alumni
Academic staff of Bethlehem University
Members of the Order of the Holy Sepulchre
21st-century Roman Catholic bishops in Israel